Dragon Ball Z: Harukanaru Densetsu, known as  in Japan and Dragon Ball Z: Goku Densetsu in Europe, is a card based role-playing video game for the Nintendo DS. The game takes place from the beginning of the Saiyan Saga to the end of the Cell Saga. Players choose from one of the four main character, Goku, Gohan, Piccolo, and Vegeta. Other characters also appear, but only as either enemies or support cards.

Gameplay 
Each mission is usually broken down into a few key objectives, each mission taking anywhere from 5 to 30 minutes to complete. The game is based on levels, the more fights you win, the more experience you receive which in turn makes your attacks stronger. In battle, the highest attack power of a card wins; however, you can also combine cards to create combination effects. For example, if you had 3 cards with a power rating of 7, you can combine these to create a 21 power card, which would most likely out-do your opponents cards. You can also combine defense in the same way.

There are several types of cards, each having a battle and map effect. In battle, Attack Cards attack the opponent with a melee attack or energy wave, Training Cards increase your defense power, Power Cards increase your power number on the other cards, Item Cards allow you to use items picked up on the board, Escape Cards allow you to leave random encounter battles (not boss battles), Reverse Cards allow you to switch the stats between your card and your opponent's, Support Cards allow an ally such as Tien, Yamcha, Yajirobe or Krillin to attack, and Z Cards allow you to choose one of the other seven actions.

Each of the eight cards has a different effect on the board, known as the map in the game. You move around the game in a boardgame like manner. The story is the Saiyan-Cell Sagas, and is split in scenarios divided up by the four characters.

Multiplayer Mode consists of a full-fledged four-player battle on a map in Wireless Play and a Vegeta-vs.-Goku 2 two player match on Download Play.

Reception 

Dragon Ball Z: Harukanaru Densetsu received generally mixed reviews from critics. It holds a score of 57 out of 100 on Metacritic and 58.37% on GameRankings.

References

Notes

External links

2007 video games
Harukanaru Densetsu
Nintendo DS games
Nintendo DS-only games
Role-playing video games
Video games developed in Japan